One-Dimensional Man: Studies in the Ideology of Advanced Industrial Society is a 1964 book by the philosopher and critical theorist Herbert Marcuse, in which the author offers a wide-ranging critique of both contemporary capitalism and the Communist society of the Soviet Union, documenting the parallel rise of new forms of social repression in both these societies, as well as the decline of revolutionary potential in the West. He argues that "advanced industrial society" created false needs, which integrated individuals into the existing system of production and consumption via mass media, advertising, industrial management, and contemporary modes of thought.

This results in a "one-dimensional" universe of thought and behavior, in which aptitude and ability for critical thought and oppositional behavior wither away. Against this prevailing climate, Marcuse promotes the "great refusal" (described at length in the book) as the only adequate opposition to all-encompassing methods of control. Much of the book is a defense of "negative thinking" as a disrupting force against the prevailing positivism.

Marcuse also analyzes the integration of the industrial working class into capitalist society and new forms of capitalist stabilization, thus questioning the Marxian postulates of the revolutionary proletariat and the inevitability of capitalist crisis. In contrast to orthodox Marxism, Marcuse champions non-integrated forces of minorities, outsiders, and radical intelligentsia, attempting to nourish oppositional thought and behavior through promoting radical thinking and opposition. He considers the trends towards bureaucracy in supposedly Marxist countries to be as oppositional to freedom as those in the capitalist West.

One-Dimensional Man bolstered Marcuse's fame as a contemporary Western philosopher.

Summary
Marcuse strongly criticizes consumerism and modern "industrial society", which he claims is a form of social control. Marcuse argues that while the system we live in may claim to be democratic, it is actually totalitarian. A form of technological rationality has imposed itself on every aspect of culture and public life, and has become hegemonic. Our identification with this hegemonic ideology of modern industrial society, this ideology doesn't only represent a form of "false-conscious", yet rather has succeeded in becoming reality. 

Modern industrial societies have furthermore created an "affluent society", which in increasing comfort have disguised the exploitative nature of the system, and have therefore strengthened means of domination and control. Modern "affluent society" therefore limits opportunities for political revolution against capitalism.

In modern consumer societies, Marcuse argues that a small number of individuals are empowered to dictate our perceptions of freedom by providing us with opportunities to buy our happiness.  In this state of "unfreedom", consumers act irrationally by working more than they are required to in order to fulfill actual basic needs, by ignoring the psychologically destructive effects, by ignoring the waste and environmental damage it causes, and by searching for social connection through material items.

It is even more irrational in the sense that the creation of new products, calling for the disposal of old products, fuels the economy and encourages the need to work more to buy more. An individual loses his humanity and becomes a tool in the industrial machine and a cog in the consumer machine. Additionally, advertising sustains consumerism, which disintegrates societal demeanor, delivered in bulk and informing the masses that happiness can be bought, an idea that is psychologically damaging.

There are alternatives to counter the consumer lifestyle. Anti-consumerism is a lifestyle that demotes any unnecessary consumption, as well as unnecessary work, waste, etc. But even this alternative is complicated by the extreme interpenetration of advertising and commodification because everything is a commodity, even those things that are actual needs.

Reception 

The critical theorist Douglas Kellner wrote that One-Dimensional Man was one of the most important books of the 1960s and one of the most subversive books of the twentieth century. Despite its pessimism, represented by the citation of the words of Walter Benjamin at the end of this book that "Nur um der Hoffnungslosen willen ist uns die Hoffnung gegeben" ("It is only for the sake of those without hope that hope is given to us"), it influenced many in the New Left as it articulated their growing dissatisfaction with both capitalist societies and Soviet communist societies.

The philosopher Ronald Aronson wrote in 2018 that One-Dimensional Man is more prescient than Marcuse could have ever realized and that it is more relevant today than ever.

See also
 Repressive desublimation
 Totalitarian democracy
 Minority rights
 J. L. Talmon
 Drux Flux, an animated short inspired by One-Dimensional Man.
Unflattening, a scholarly graphic novel expanding on many ideas from One-Dimensional Man.
 Critical theory
 Criticism of capitalism
 Inverted totalitarianism
 Superficiality

References

External links

 Bibliographic listing including reviews and courses using the book
 Full text on-line at marcuse.org

1964 non-fiction books
Books critical of capitalism
Beacon Press books
English-language books
Frankfurt School
Sociology books
Works by Herbert Marcuse